Łucja Weronika Prus (Białystok, 25 May 1942 - Warsaw, 3 July 2002 in Warsaw) was a Polish singer.

Career 
She made her musical debut at the age of 20 in mid sixties. Known for her performances on the Polish stage as well as from numerous movie and TV series soundtracks. Her best known songs include Nic dwa razy się nie zdarza (Nothing Comes Twice), Dookoła noc się stała (Night Became All Around), Twój portret (Your Portrait), W żółtych płomieniach liści (In the Yellow Flames of the Leaves), Walc chopinowski (Chopin Waltz), Tango z różą w zębach (Tango with a Rose in the Teeth) .

She collaborated with many prominent songwriters (Włodzimierz Nahorny, Jonasz Kofta, Jan Wołek, Agnieszka Osiecka), singers (Alicja Majewska, Jerzy Połomski), and bands (Skaldowie).

Private life 
Her first husband was Polish composer and pianist Andrzej Mundkowski. The marriage did not last and after divorce Łucja Prus married Ryszard Kozicz, music band manager (e.g., Skaldowie). Her daughter Julia was born from the latter matrimony.

She died of breast cancer in 2002.

Discography 

 1974 Łucja Prus
 1978 Łucja Prus dzieciom
 1980 Łucja Prus
 1986 Domowe przedszkole: Piosenki dla dzieci
 1988 Kolędy (z A. Majewską, J. Połomskim i W. Korczem)
 1994 Dla dzieci od lat 3
 1996 Szymborska Poems, Songs
 1996 W dzień Bożego Narodzenia
 1999 Złota kolekcja / Nic dwa razy się nie zdarza
 2003 Czułość
 2004 Platynowa kolekcja / Złote przeboje

References

1942 births
2002 deaths
20th-century Polish women singers
Artists from Białystok